Sayenjeq (also Romanized as Sāyenjeq; also known as Sārīnjeq and Sāyenjīq) is a village in Baruq Rural District, Baruq District, Miandoab County, West Azerbaijan Province, Iran. At the 2006 census, its population was 124, in 25 families.

References 

Populated places in Miandoab County